(Shout for joy, exult, rise up, praise the day), BWV 248I (also written as BWV 248 I), is a 1734 Christmas cantata by Johann Sebastian Bach that serves as the first part of his Christmas Oratorio. Bach was then Thomaskantor, responsible for church music at four churches in Leipzig, a position he had assumed in 1723. For the oratorio, the libretto by an unknown author followed the nativity of Jesus from the Gospel of Luke, interspersed with reflecting texts for recitatives and arias, and stanzas from Lutheran hymns.

The cantata is structured in nine movements. An extended choral introduction is followed by two scenes, each a sequence of four movements. Both scenes are composed of a quotation from the Gospel of Luke, a recitative reflecting the narration, an aria-like prayer or meditation, and a chorale setting a stanza from a Lutheran hymn. Bach scored the cantata for three vocal soloists, a four-part choir and a festive Baroque orchestra with trumpets, timpani, flutes, oboes and strings. A tenor soloist narrates the Biblical story in secco recitative, as the Evangelist. There are two chorales: a four-part setting of Paul Gerhardt's "Wie soll ich dich empfangen" and a closing score with an independent orchestra set to text for a stanza from Martin Luther's "Vom Himmel hoch, da komm ich her".

The opening movement and the two arias rely on secular cantatas composed for members of the Dresden court. Ring out, ye trumpets!), BWV214, which he had composed for the birthday of Maria Josepha of Saxony on 8 December 1733.

Bach led the first performances with the Thomanerchor at the two main churches of Leipzig on 25 December 1734 during morning and vespers services.

Background 

Since his appointment as director musices in Leipzig in 1723, Bach had been presenting church cantatas for the Christmas season in the Thomaskirche (St. Thomas Church) and Nikolaikirche (St. Nicholas Church), including the following Christmas Day cantatas:
 1723: , originally composed in 1714 as part of Bach's Weimar cantata cycle and adopted in his first cantata cycle after its presentation in Leipzig during the 1723–24 Christmas season;
 1724:  (early version), part of the chorale cantata cycle;
 1725: , part of Bach's third cantata cycle;
 1728 (or 1729): , a partly lost cantata of the Picander cycle of 1728–29.
Church music in Latin was not uncommon for Christmas Day in Leipzig: Bach's compositions of this genre include, for Christmas Day of 1723, the Christmas version of his Magnificat, BWV 243a, and the Sanctus in D major, BWV 238. Another Sanctus, the Sanctus for six vocal parts, BWV 232 III (early version), was composed for Christmas Day of 1724.

Dresden court 

In 1733, Augustus III of Poland succeeded his father, Augustus the Strong, as Elector of Saxony and took residence in Dresden. Bach hoped to become court composer, and dedicated Missa of 1733 to Augustus.

He wrote a further cantata for the elector's wife, Maria Josepha, to honour her 34th birthday on 8 December:  (Resound, ye drums! Ring out, ye trumpets!). It is also known as "" (Congratulation cantata for the Queen's birthday), although Maria Josepha was not crowned Queen of Poland until January 1734.

Readings and text 
Bach composed  in 1734. The cantata forms Part I of his Christmas Oratorio, which was performed on six occasions during Christmas time, beginning with Part I on Christmas Day. The prescribed readings for the feast day were one from the Epistle to Titus, "God's mercy appeared", or Isaiah, "Unto us a child is born", and a second from the Gospel of Luke describing the nativity, annunciation to the shepherds and angels' song. The identity of the librettist is unknown; he may have been Picander, an earlier collaborator. After the opening chorus, the story is told following the Gospel of Luke, interspersed with reflecting recitatives, arias and chorales. Part I describes the nativity of Jesus until the child is born.

The work is structured in nine movements. The text of the opening chorus is a free paraphrase of the beginning of Psalm 100. The chorus is followed by two groups of four movements each, following the pattern: reading / recitative / aria / chorale. Alfred Dürr notes that the theologian August Hermann Francke and others had recommended three steps when reading the Bible: reading / meditation / prayer, and sees a similar approach, with the chorale comparing to the amen confirming the prayer.

The tenor soloist narrates from Martin Luther's translation of the Bible in recitative as the Evangelist. The choir sings two chorales, a four-part setting of Paul Gerhardt's "Wie soll ich dich empfangen" and a setting for choir and independent orchestra of the 13th stanza from Martin Luther's "Vom Himmel hoch, da komm ich her", to close the cantata. In the seventh movement, a recitative is combined with the sixth stanza of Luther's hymn "Gelobet seist du, Jesu Christ".

First performance 

Bach led the first performance during a morning rendition at the Nikolaikirche in 1734. The libretto was printed and bears the title of the oratorio, Oratorium, welches die Heilige Weyhnacht über in beyden Haupt-Kirchen zu Leipzig musiciret wurde. Anno 1734. (Oratorio, which was played over the Holy Christmas in the two main churches of Leipzig. 1734.) The title for Jauchzet! frohlocket! reads: "Am 1sten Heil. Weynachts-Feyertage. Frühe zu St. Nicolai, und Nachmittage zu St. Thomas" (On the 1st Holy Christmas Day. Morning at St. Nicholas, afternoon at St. Thomas).

Music

Scoring and structure 
Bach structured the cantata in nine movements, beginning with an extended chorus. The other eight movements contain a Gospel reading in a tenor secco recitative, a meditative, accompanied recitative, a prayer-like aria, and an affirming chorale. It features three vocal soloists (alto, tenor and bass), a four-part choir and a Baroque instrumental ensemble of three trumpets (Tr), timpani, two traversos (Tra), two oboes (Ob), two oboes d'amore (Oa), two violins (Vl), viola (Va) and basso continuo. A typical performance lasts 29 minutes.

The keys and time signatures are taken from Dürr and use the symbol for common time. The continuo, played throughout, is not shown.

Movements

1 

The text of the opening chorus is "", translated by Richard D. P. Jones as "Shout for joy, exult, rise up, praise the day!" and by Pamela Dellal as "Celebrate, rejoice, rise up and praise these days". It is an extended complex ternary form (A–B–A). Unusually for Bach's music, it opens with the timpani (kettledrums) alone. The trumpets then enter, followed by strings and woodwinds. This sequence follows the secular model Tönet, ihr Pauken, where the text asks the instruments to enter in this order: "" (Sound, you drums! Ring forth, trumpets! Vibrating strings, fill the air! Now sing songs, you exuberant poets). The extended instrumental ritornello presents the musical material of the whole movement in changing instrumental colours. The first measures explore the D major triad in different colours of instrumental sounds.

The voices enter in unison, imitating at first timpani then trumpets. In the following section, the vocal lines are mostly homophonic and sometimes imitative, while the instrumental forces drive the movement. With the text "" (Abandon despair, banish laments), the voices, now in imitation, dominate while the instruments accompany. The second section is a modified repetition of the first.

The middle section (B) also comprises two passages. "" (Serve the Highest with glorious choruses) is an imitative section in B minor, accompanied only by the strings. "" (Let us revere the name of the sovereign) is set mostly in homophony with strings and woodwinds. After the middle section, the beginning A is repeated in full.

The musicologist Markus Rathey notes that in the secular model, Tönet, ihr Pauken, Bach had not initially thought of beginning with the timpani alone, but arrived at the present version in a later revision. Rathey suggests that Bach sought a more dramatic way to begin with reduced force and let the music increase, in keeping with his endeavor to transfer operatic features from Dresden to Leipzig. Rathey observes that listeners at the time may have interpreted the dominant trumpets as royal instruments, here three trumpets and timpani, corresponding to the obbligato trumpet in the aria "Großer Herr und starker König", which addresses the newborn as both king and saviour.

2 
The tenor begins with the secco recitative "" (It came to pass at that time), from Luke 2:1,3–6. It is one of the longest recitatives in the oratorio, beginning with the decree for a census by Caesar Augustus. It follows a pattern influenced both by operatic recitatives and liturgical singing, with phrases often beginning with an upward fourth and ending with a downward fourth, in rhythm as if speaking and in moderate range. Accents are made by high notes, here for the word "Joseph", and changes of harmony, here for "David". The building of harmonic tension ends when Mary's pregnancy is mentioned.

3 
The alto provides the narration, particularly the announcement of a birth, in a recitative, "" (Now my dearest bridegroom, now the hero from David's branch), expressing eagerness to meet her bridegroom, a descendant of David, in the imagery of the Song of Songs. In an accompanied recitative, two oboes d'amore support the voice.

4 

In the alto da capo aria "" (Prepare yourself, Zion, with tender efforts), the singer prepares herself to meeting her beloved. The oboe d'amore supports the tender expressiveness. The movement is based on the aria "Ich will dich nicht hören" (No. 9) from the secular cantata Laßt uns sorgen, laßt uns wachen, BWV 213, with a different affect. While the secular model demands destruction ("zermalmet"), the aria in the oratorio speaks of the most beautiful beloved ("den Liebsten, den Schönsten").

5 
A chorale concludes the first scene, "" (How shall I embrace You), deepening the right preparation for the reception of the beloved. It is the first stanza of Paul Gerhardt's Advent song, with the melody which was associated with it in Leipzig, the same melody also used for Gerhardt's Passion hymn "O Haupt voll Blut und Wunden". The same melody of this first chorale in the oratorio reappears in the final movement of the final Part VI, "Nun seid ihr wohl gerochen".

6 
The tenor continues the narration with another secco recitative, "" (And she bore her first son), after Luke 2:7, reporting the birth of the baby which is laid in a manger.

7 

In a combination of chorale and recitative, the soprano sings the sixth stanza, "" (He came to earth poor), from Luther's hymn "" in a triple metre and embellished. Line by line, it is interspersed with comments by the bass, who begins "" (Who can rightly exalt this love), in contrasting common time. The voices are supported by two oboes d'amore.

8 
The bass da capo aria, "" (Great Lord, o powerful King, dearest Savior, o how little), contrasts the birth of Our Lord with poverty. The movement is taken from the bass aria in Tönet, ihr Pauken, in which the Queen is addressed, accompanied by an obbligato trumpet to refer to her royalty.

9 
The cantata is closed with the chorale "" (Ah, my heart's beloved little Jesus), the 13th stanza of Luther's hymn "". While the compassionate text addresses the baby, interjections by trumpets and timpani recall the opening movement and refer to his godly nature.

Performances and legacy 
Bach may have performed Jauchzet, frohlocket! again, but there is no record of it. Although performances of Jauchzet, frohlocket! in Christmas Day services have become rare, they are regularly held in Leipzig where the work was first performed. The cantata is often presented in concerts that usually combine several of the parts of the Christmas Oratorio, most frequently parts I to III. It is a Christmas tradition for German-speaking people to attend such a concert.

Dürr and Jones described the cantata as "one of the pinnacles of world music literature". Rathey observes that although the Christmas Oratorio is one of Bach's most frequently performed works, it has not attracted much scholarship in English.

References

Cited sources 
Bach Digital
 
 
 
 
 
 
 

Books
 
 
 
 
 

Online sources

External links 
 
 
 
 

Church cantatas by Johann Sebastian Bach
1734 compositions
Christmas cantatas